Rajahmundry Urban mandal, officially known as Rajamahendravaram Urban mandal, is one of the 19 mandals in East Godavari of the state of Andhra Pradesh, India. It has its headquarters at Rajahmundry city, that covers the entire urban mandal. The mandal is surrounded by Rajahmundry (rural) mandal and lies on the banks of Godavari River.

Demographics 

 census, the mandal had a population of 341,831. The total population constitute, 168,735 males and 173,096 females —a sex ratio of 1029 females per 1000 males. 32,024 children are in the age group of 0–6 years, of which 16,261 are boys and 15,763 are girls —a ratio of 969 per 1000. The average literacy rate stands at 84.12% with 260,616 literates.

See also 
List of mandals in Andhra Pradesh

References 

 

Mandals in East Godavari district